The Via Nova or Via XVIII in the Antonine Itinerary (also known as Geira) is a Roman road which linked the cities of Bracara Augusta (current Braga) and Asturica Augusta (current Astorga), with a length of about 210 roman miles (about 330 kilometers).

History
It was built between the years 79 and 80 during the rule of Vespasian and his son Titus  by the legate C. Calpetanus Rantius Quirinalis Velerius Festus for commercial purposes, and restored in the times of Maximinus Thrax and his son Gaius Julius Verus Maximus. Its layout is reflected in detail in the Antonine Itinerary (3rd century).

Along its route, the roman miles are marked by milestones. Between Bracara Ausgusta and Asturica Augusta there are eleven mansio (post station and lodging). This route conserves the largest number of milestones in all of Europe.

Itinerary

References

External links
Instituto Nacional de Conservação da Natureza. Geira : Via Romana XVIII.
LEMOS, Francisco de Sande; BAPTISTA, António Martinho. «Estudo de um troço da Via XVIII do Itinerário de Antonino na Serra do Gerês», in Cadernos de Arqueologia, série II, 12-13, 1995-1996, pp. 113–133.
RODRIGUEZ COLMERO, Antonio; FERRER SIERRA, Santiago; ALVAREZ ASOREY, Rubén D. Miliarios e outras inscricións viarias romanas do noroeste hispánico (conventos Bracarense, Lucence e Asturicence). Santiago de Compostela, Consello da Cultura Galega (gl).

Roman roads in Spain
Roman roads in Portugal